James G. Taylor (born February 5, 1966) is an American politician who served as a member of the New Mexico House of Representatives for the 12th district from 1994 through 2004 and New Mexico Senate for the 14th district from 2004 to 2008.

Career 
Taylor was elected to the New Mexico House of Representatives in 1994. In 2004, Taylor was appointed to the New Mexico Senate. In 2008 he was defeated for re-election in the Democratic primary by Eric Griego, a member of the Albuquerque City Council. After losing the primary, he filed a lawsuit to overturn the results of the election. In 2012, Taylor ran for his old seat. He placed third in the Democratic primary after Eleanor Chavez and eventual winner Michael Padilla.

References

External links
 Senator James G. Taylor(2004-2008) at New Mexico Legislature
 Representative James G. Taylor (1995-2004) at New Mexico Legislature
 James Taylor - Biography at Project Vote Smart
 Follow the Money – James G Taylor
 2008 2006 2004 2002 2000 1998 1996 1994 campaign contributions

1966 births
Living people
New Mexico state senators
Members of the New Mexico House of Representatives